Fathis Handhuvaruge Feshun 3D is a 2013 Maldivian romantic horror film directed by Ali Shifau. Produced by Mohamed Ali under Dark Rain Entertainment, the film stars Yoosuf Shafeeu, Fathimath Fareela and Ahmed Nimal in pivotal roles. The film was released on 4 April 2013. It serves as a prequel to Fathis Handhuvaru (1997) which starred Reeko Moosa Manik and Niuma Mohamed in lead roles. It also celebrates the first 3D Maldivian film released in the cinema.

Cast  
Yoosuf Shafeeu as Jinaa
Fathimath Fareela as Niha
Mohamed Faisal as Adam Saleem
Ahmed Nimal as Naseem
Ahmed Saeed as Shareef
Mohamed Faisal as Zuhairu
Hamid Ali as Hassana
Aminath Ameela as Shafeega
Hawwa Zahira as Latheefa
Mariyam Haleem as Bodudaitha
Zainab Mansoor as Naasiha
Shahid Mohamed as Shahid
Mohamed Ibrahim as Mechanic
Ahmed Faiz as Waiter
Ali Zaidan as Boy running
Abdulla Ajuwad as Boy running
Abdullah Hussain Abusy as Jina
Ibrahim Wisan as Badheeu (Special appearance)
 Rafiyath Rameeza as Zoona (Special appearance)

Development
Fathis Handhuvaruge Feshun 3D was based on a story published by Ibrahim Waheed on an online news platform Haveeru Daily. Titled Jinaa: Fathis Handhuvaruge Feshun (2009), the story serves as prequel to the story Fathishandhuvaru (1996) written by Waheed which was later adapted to a film by same name in 1997. The film was marketed as being the first 3D release for a Maldivian film and the first release derived from spin-off. It was also hyped as the most awaited release of the year. It was made on a budget of MVR 1,300,000.

Release and response
Fathis Handhuvaruge Feshun 3D was initially slated to release on 28 September 2012, however, shifted for an early 2013 release due to the unavailability of cinema. The dates further fluctuated before being finalised for 5 April 2013 release, due to the ongoing upgrading work of cinema.

Upon release the film received generally negative reviews from critics. Ahmed Nadheem from Haveeru Daily criticised the screenplay for the lack of "amusement" and the "abrupt rush" in story-line with "flaws in the script". He further deprecate the acting of the cast; "Not only Yoosuf Shafeeu, everyone in the cast gave a forgettable performance barring Ahmed Nimal. He concluded the review praising the efforts put into visual effect and addressing the "dislike of the film in comparison to Fathis Handhuvaru". Fathimath Zaina from Vnews echoed similar sentiments and mentioned: "It brings a good opportunity for Maldivians to experience a Dhivehi film in 3D, however it is a disappointment as a film overall. It does not bring justice to the genre it represent and so does the same to the story it's based on".

Ibrahim Waheed, who originally penned the story, disapproved the film; "The story proceeded with no pace, the film moved unnoticed, bass sound was so high you do not hear the dialogues well, direction extremely weak".

Soundtrack

Accolades

References

External links 
 

2013 films
Dark Rain Entertainment films
2013 horror films
Maldivian horror films
Films directed by Ali Shifau